Eoophyla profalcatalis is a moth in the family Crambidae. It was described by Birgit Jaenicke and Wolfram Mey in 2011. It is found on Sumatra.

References

Eoophyla
Moths described in 2011